Animal Crossing: amiibo Festival is a 2015 party video game developed by Nintendo and NDcube for the Wii U. Similar to the Mario Party series, the game is a spin-off of the Animal Crossing series that moves away from the series traditional format, instead being a party game that primarily integrates amiibo figures into the gameplay. Alongside the release of the game, 8 Animal Crossing amiibo character figures were released for use in the game. It was released worldwide in November 2015. 

Animal Crossing: amiibo Festival was a commercial failure and received negative reviews from critics who criticised the repetitive gameplay, poor amiibo integration and lack of innovation; though its presentation was praised.

Gameplay 

amiibo Festival is a virtual board game similar in style to the Mario Party series. Playable Animal Crossing characters include Isabelle, K.K. Slider, Tom Nook, and Mabel—four of the series' eight characters upon which amiibo toys had been based. The game also supports the amiibo cards which had debuted alongside Animal Crossing: Happy Home Designer, and generally requires the use of Amiibo toys for play.

Development 
Director Aya Kyogoku stated that the game was conceived as a vehicle for the creation of the first Animal Crossing amiibo: "Honestly, we just wanted Animal Crossing amiibo. We wanted the company to make Animal Crossing amiibo, so that's why we made a game that works with them."

The game was announced during the Nintendo Digital Event at E3 2015 for release in Q4 2015 during the holiday season, later specified as November 2015. Kyogoku distinguished the game from Mario Party by stating that the latter is more focused on minigames, while amiibo Festival is more of a board game. The game uses Nintendo's amiibo protocol to insert characters into the game, with eight different amiibo toys bundled with the game's release. The characters each have personal characteristics, including a house associated with the character as designed in Happy Home Designer.

Animal Crossing: amiibo Festival was released exclusively as a retail product, and is not digitally available on the Nintendo eShop in any region.

Reception 

Unlike its predecessors, Animal Crossing: amiibo Festival received mixed to negative reviews from critics, according to video game review aggregator Metacritic, with an aggregate score of 46 out of 100. IGN rated the game at 5 out of 10, saying that the Amiibo integration is "cumbersome" and "hard to play with" and that the gameplay is a boring and slow "snooze fest" — having almost fallen asleep while playing. The game was praised as "undoubtedly charming", relaxing, and best played with friends. Nintendo World Report gave the game a 4.5 out of 10, citing "Boring, repetitive gameplay" and "Tak[ing] an hour to get anything good." GamesBeat gave the game 3.3 out of 10 and condemned it for being "a blatant attempt to get you to buy more amiibo, and it’s not even a good one at that." Not all reviewers were so critical; Famitsu scored the game 32/40, with each of the four reviewers giving it a score of 8.

The game proved to be a commercial failure, selling only 20,303 copies within its first week of release in Japan.

References

External links 

2015 video games
Animal Crossing video games
Digital board games
Multiplayer and single-player video games
Nintendo Entertainment Planning & Development games
Party video games
Video game spin-offs
Video games about dogs
Video games about raccoons
Video games developed in Japan
Video games that use Amiibo figurines
Wii U games
Wii U-only games
NDcube games